Blytheville Municipal Airport  is a public use airport located three nautical miles (4 mi, 6 km) east of the central business district of Blytheville, in Mississippi County, Arkansas, United States. It is owned by the City of Blytheville.

This airport is included in the FAA's National Plan of Integrated Airport Systems for 2011–2015, which categorized it as a general aviation facility.

Facilities and aircraft 
Blytheville Municipal Airport covers an area of 88 acres (36 ha) at an elevation of 256 feet (78 m) above mean sea level. It has one runway designated 18/36 with an asphalt surface measuring 4,999 by 75 feet (1,524 x 23 m).

For the 12-month period ending August 31, 2009, the airport had 41,000 aircraft operations, an average of 112 per day: 95% general aviation, 4% air taxi, and 1% military. At that time there were 17 aircraft based at this airport: 77% single-engine, 12% multi-engine, 6% helicopter, and 6% ultralight.

References

External links 
 Aerial image as of 26 March 2001 from USGS The National Map
 

Airports in Arkansas
Transportation in Mississippi County, Arkansas